Wayne Karlin (born June 13, 1945, Los Angeles) is an American author, editor, and teacher. His books include A Wolf by the Ears, Wandering Souls, Marble Mountain, War Movies: Journeys to Vietnam, The Wished-For Country, Prisoners, Rumors and Stones, Crossover, Lost Armies, The Extras, and Us.

Early life, college and military career

Karlin attended White Plains High School, in New York and then served in the U.S. Marine Corps from 1963 to 1967, when he was honorably discharged with the rank of sergeant. His decorations include the Vietnam Service Medal, the Air Medal, a Presidential Unit Citation, and the Combat Air Crew Badge with three stars. He received a Bachelor of Arts degree in Humanities in 1970 from the American College in Jerusalem and his Master's degree in Creative Writing from Goddard College in 1976.

Post war and professional career

He retired as Professor Emeritus from the College of Southern Maryland, where he taught for over thirty years. He was also American editor of the Curbstone Press Voices from Vietnam series of books. That series includes The Other Side of Heaven: Postwar Fiction by Vietnamese and American Writers (1995), which he co-edited with Lê Minh Khuê and Truong Lu; The Stars, The Earth, The River: Short Fiction by Lê Minh Khuê (1997); Behind the Red Mist: Fiction by Hồ Anh Thái (1998); Against the Flood, a novel by Ma Văn Kháng (2000); Past Continuous, a novel by Nguyễn Khải (2001); The Cemetery of Chua Village and Other Stories by Đoàn Lê; (2005), Love After War: Contemporary Fiction from Viet Nam, co-edited with Hồ Anh Thái (2003), An Insignificant Family, by Dạ Ngân (2009), and Apocalypse Bell, by Hồ Anh Thái (2012), published by the Texas Tech University Press. 

Karlin also adapted and edited In Whose Eyes, the memoir of the Vietnamese filmmaker Trần Văn Thủy, published by the University of Massachusetts Press in October 2016.

Karlin was one of the script writers and served as a technical consultant and acted in the feature film Song of the Stork, a Vietnamese–Singaporean co-production, which won awards at several film festivals in Europe and Asia.

In 2006, Karlin was consulting producer and writer for Shared Weight, a series of hour-long radio programs involving interviews with writers, film makers and artists in Vietnam, and journeys of reconciliation. The programs were done by the Center for Emerging Media for National Public Radio. He wrote the script for "Wandering Souls", a follow up program, in 2009.

Karlin's short stories and essays have been widely anthologized and have appeared in many literary magazines, including Glimmer Train, Indiana Review, Michigan Quarterly Review, North American Review, and Prairie Schooner.
 
His essay about Maryland appeared in the landmark anthology These United States: Portraits of America, published by Nation Books in 2003, and his essay “Kissing the Dead”, paired with Catherine Leroy's photographs, appeared in her book Under Fire: Great Photographers and Writers in Vietnam (Random House, 2005). His articles and book reviews have appeared in The Baltimore Sun, The Washington Post, The Nation, and the Los Angeles Times.

Karlin has received five State of Maryland Individual Artist Awards in Fiction, two fellowships from the National Endowment for the Arts, the Paterson Prize in Fiction the Vietnam Veterans of America Excellence in the Arts Award, and the University of Massachusetts Juniper Prize for Fiction 2019 for his novel A Wolf by The Ears. Prisoners was named an Outstanding Novel of 1998 in the Dictionary of Literary Biography Yearbook and The Wished-For Country was selected as an Outstanding Novel in the 2002 Yearbook. Love After War was named one of the best books of the year of 2003 by the San Francisco Gate. 

The manuscript of his novel-in-progress "What Their Fathers Never Told Them" was a finalist for the 2021 PEN American Bellwether Prize for Socially Conscious Fiction.

Personal life
Karlin lives in Saint Mary's County, Maryland, and was married for 44 years to Ohnmar Thein Karlin, who died in 2020. Their son, Adam Karlin, is a travel writer, most of whose work is published through Lonely Planet. His daughter-in-law, Rachel Hogue works for the Environmental Protection Agency.  He has two grandchildren, Sanda and Isaac.

References

External links
 Curbstone Press Author page
 Center for Emerging Media
 Song of the Stork
 "Pilgrim's Progress: Wayne Karlin and the Vietnam War," The VVA Veteran, July/August 2005

1945 births
Living people
American male journalists
Journalists from California
Goddard College alumni
Writers from Maryland
People from St. Mary's County, Maryland
Writers from Los Angeles
Recipients of the Air Medal
United States Marine Corps personnel of the Vietnam War
United States Marines
White Plains High School alumni